Impressionism was a 19th-century art movement characterized by relatively small, thin, yet visible brush strokes, open composition, emphasis on accurate depiction of light in its changing qualities (often accentuating the effects of the passage of time), ordinary subject matter, unusual visual angles, and inclusion of movement as a crucial element of human perception and experience. Impressionism originated with a group of Paris-based artists whose independent exhibitions brought them to prominence during the 1870s and 1880s.

The Impressionists faced harsh opposition from the conventional art community in France. The name of the style derives from the title of a Claude Monet work, Impression, soleil levant (Impression, Sunrise), which provoked the critic Louis Leroy to coin the term in a satirical review published in the Parisian newspaper Le Charivari. The development of Impressionism in the visual arts was soon followed by analogous styles in other media that became known as impressionist music and impressionist literature.

Overview 

Radicals in their time, early Impressionists violated the rules of academic painting. They constructed their pictures from freely brushed colours that took precedence over lines and contours, following the example of painters such as Eugène Delacroix and J. M. W. Turner. They also painted realistic scenes of modern life, and often painted outdoors. Previously, still lifes and portraits as well as landscapes were usually painted in a studio. The Impressionists found that they could capture the momentary and transient effects of sunlight by painting outdoors or en plein air. They portrayed overall visual effects instead of details, and used short "broken" brush strokes of mixed and pure unmixed colour—not blended smoothly or shaded, as was customary—to achieve an effect of intense colour vibration.

Impressionism emerged in France at the same time that a number of other painters, including the Italian artists known as the Macchiaioli, and Winslow Homer in the United States, were also exploring plein-air painting. The Impressionists, however, developed new techniques specific to the style. Encompassing what its adherents argued was a different way of seeing, it is an art of immediacy and movement, of candid poses and compositions, of the play of light expressed in a bright and varied use of colour.

The public, at first hostile, gradually came to believe that the Impressionists had captured a fresh and original vision, even if the art critics and art establishment disapproved of the new style. By recreating the sensation in the eye that views the subject, rather than delineating the details of the subject, and by creating a welter of techniques and forms, Impressionism is a precursor of various painting styles, including Neo-Impressionism, Post-Impressionism, Fauvism, and Cubism.

Beginnings 
In the middle of the 19th century—a time of change, as Emperor Napoleon III rebuilt Paris and waged war—the Académie des Beaux-Arts dominated French art. The Académie was the preserver of traditional French painting standards of content and style. Historical subjects, religious themes, and portraits were valued; landscape and still life were not. The Académie preferred carefully finished images that looked realistic when examined closely. Paintings in this style were made up of precise brush strokes carefully blended to hide the artist's hand in the work. Colour was restrained and often toned down further by the application of a golden varnish.

The Académie had an annual, juried art show, the Salon de Paris, and artists whose work was displayed in the show won prizes, garnered commissions, and enhanced their prestige. The standards of the juries represented the values of the Académie, represented by the works of such artists as Jean-Léon Gérôme and Alexandre Cabanel.

In the early 1860s, four young painters—Claude Monet, Pierre-Auguste Renoir, Alfred Sisley, and Frédéric Bazille—met while studying under the academic artist Charles Gleyre. They discovered that they shared an interest in painting landscape and contemporary life rather than historical or mythological scenes. Following a practice—pioneered by artists such as the Englishman John Constable— that had become increasingly popular by mid-century, they often ventured into the countryside together to paint in the open air. Their purpose was not to make sketches to be developed into carefully finished works in the studio, as was the usual custom, but to complete their paintings out-of-doors. By painting in sunlight directly from nature, and making bold use of the vivid synthetic pigments that had become available since the beginning of the century, they began to develop a lighter and brighter manner of painting that extended further the Realism of Gustave Courbet and the Barbizon school. A favourite meeting place for the artists was the Café Guerbois on Avenue de Clichy in Paris, where the discussions were often led by Édouard Manet, whom the younger artists greatly admired. They were soon joined by Camille Pissarro, Paul Cézanne, and Armand Guillaumin.

During the 1860s, the Salon jury routinely rejected about half of the works submitted by Monet and his friends in favour of works by artists faithful to the approved style. In 1863, the Salon jury rejected Manet's The Luncheon on the Grass (Le déjeuner sur l'herbe) primarily because it depicted a nude woman with two clothed men at a picnic. While the Salon jury routinely accepted nudes in historical and allegorical paintings, they condemned Manet for placing a realistic nude in a contemporary setting. The jury's severely worded rejection of Manet's painting appalled his admirers, and the unusually large number of rejected works that year perturbed many French artists.

After Emperor Napoleon III saw the rejected works of 1863, he decreed that the public be allowed to judge the work themselves, and the Salon des Refusés (Salon of the Refused) was organized. While many viewers came only to laugh, the Salon des Refusés drew attention to the existence of a new tendency in art and attracted more visitors than the regular Salon.

Artists' petitions requesting a new Salon des Refusés in 1867, and again in 1872, were denied. In December 1873, Monet, Renoir, Pissarro, Sisley, Cézanne, Berthe Morisot, Edgar Degas and several other artists founded the Société Anonyme Coopérative des Artistes Peintres, Sculpteurs, Graveurs ("Cooperative and Anonymous Association of Painters, Sculptors, and Engravers") to exhibit their artworks independently. Members of the association were expected to forswear participation in the Salon. The organizers invited a number of other progressive artists to join them in their inaugural exhibition, including the older Eugène Boudin, whose example had first persuaded Monet to adopt plein air painting years before. Another painter who greatly influenced Monet and his friends, Johan Jongkind, declined to participate, as did Édouard Manet. In total, thirty artists participated in their first exhibition, held in April 1874 at the studio of the photographer Nadar.

The critical response was mixed. Monet and Cézanne received the harshest attacks. Critic and humorist Louis Leroy wrote a scathing review in the newspaper Le Charivari in which, making wordplay with the title of Claude Monet's Impression, Sunrise (Impression, soleil levant), he gave the artists the name by which they became known. Derisively titling his article "The Exhibition of the Impressionists", Leroy declared that Monet's painting was at most, a sketch, and could hardly be termed a finished work.

He wrote, in the form of a dialogue between viewers,
"Impression—I was certain of it. I was just telling myself that, since I was impressed, there had to be some impression in it ... and what freedom, what ease of workmanship! Wallpaper in its embryonic state is more finished than that seascape."

The term Impressionist quickly gained favour with the public. It was also accepted by the artists themselves, even though they were a diverse group in style and temperament, unified primarily by their spirit of independence and rebellion. They exhibited together—albeit with shifting membership—eight times between 1874 and 1886. The Impressionists' style, with its loose, spontaneous brushstrokes, would soon become synonymous with modern life.

Monet, Sisley, Morisot, and Pissarro may be considered the "purest" Impressionists, in their consistent pursuit of an art of spontaneity, sunlight, and colour. Degas rejected much of this, as he believed in the primacy of drawing over colour and belittled the practice of painting outdoors. Renoir turned away from Impressionism for a time during the 1880s, and never entirely regained his commitment to its ideas. Édouard Manet, although regarded by the Impressionists as their leader, never abandoned his liberal use of black as a colour (while Impressionists avoided its use and preferred to obtain darker colours by mixing), and never participated in the Impressionist exhibitions. He continued to submit his works to the Salon, where his painting Spanish Singer had won a 2nd class medal in 1861, and he urged the others to do likewise, arguing that "the Salon is the real field of battle" where a reputation could be made.

Among the artists of the core group (minus Bazille, who had died in the Franco-Prussian War in 1870), defections occurred as Cézanne, followed later by Renoir, Sisley, and Monet, abstained from the group exhibitions so they could submit their works to the Salon. Disagreements arose from issues such as Guillaumin's membership in the group, championed by Pissarro and Cézanne against opposition from Monet and Degas, who thought him unworthy. Degas invited Mary Cassatt to display her work in the 1879 exhibition, but also insisted on the inclusion of Jean-François Raffaëlli, Ludovic Lepic, and other realists who did not represent Impressionist practices, causing Monet in 1880 to accuse the Impressionists of "opening doors to first-come daubers". In this regard, the seventh Paris Impressionist exhibition in 1882 was the most selective of all including the works of only nine "true" impressionists, namely Gustave Caillebotte, Paul Gauguin, Armand Guillaumin, Claude Monet, Berthe Morisot, Camille Pissarro, Pierre-Auguste Renoir, Alfred Sisley, and Victor Vignon. The group then divided again over the invitations to Paul Signac and Georges Seurat to exhibit with them at the 8th Impressionist exhibition in 1886. Pissarro was the only artist to show at all eight Paris Impressionist exhibitions.

The individual artists achieved few financial rewards from the Impressionist exhibitions, but their art gradually won a degree of public acceptance and support. Their dealer, Durand-Ruel, played a major role in this as he kept their work before the public and arranged shows for them in London and New York. Although Sisley died in poverty in 1899, Renoir had a great Salon success in 1879. Monet became secure financially during the early 1880s and so did Pissarro by the early 1890s. By this time the methods of Impressionist painting, in a diluted form, had become commonplace in Salon art.

Impressionist techniques 

French painters who prepared the way for Impressionism include the Romantic colourist Eugène Delacroix, the leader of the realists Gustave Courbet, and painters of the Barbizon school such as Théodore Rousseau. The Impressionists learned much from the work of Johan Barthold Jongkind, Jean-Baptiste-Camille Corot and Eugène Boudin, who painted from nature in a direct and spontaneous style that prefigured Impressionism, and who befriended and advised the younger artists.

A number of identifiable techniques and working habits contributed to the innovative style of the Impressionists. Although these methods had been used by previous artists—and are often conspicuous in the work of artists such as Frans Hals, Diego Velázquez, Peter Paul Rubens, John Constable, and J. M. W. Turner—the Impressionists were the first to use them all together, and with such consistency. These techniques include:

 Short, thick strokes of paint quickly capture the essence of the subject, rather than its details. The paint is often applied impasto.
 Colours are applied side by side with as little mixing as possible, a technique that exploits the principle of simultaneous contrast to make the colour appear more vivid to the viewer.
 Greys and dark tones are produced by mixing complementary colours. Pure impressionism avoids the use of black paint.
 Wet paint is placed into wet paint without waiting for successive applications to dry, producing softer edges and intermingling of colour.
 Impressionist paintings do not exploit the transparency of thin paint films (glazes), which earlier artists manipulated carefully to produce effects. The impressionist painting surface is typically opaque.
 The paint is applied to a white or light-coloured ground. Previously, painters often used dark grey or strongly coloured grounds.
 The play of natural light is emphasized. Close attention is paid to the reflection of colours from object to object. Painters often worked in the evening to produce effets de soir—the shadowy effects of evening or twilight.
 In paintings made en plein air (outdoors), shadows are boldly painted with the blue of the sky as it is reflected onto surfaces, giving a sense of freshness previously not represented in painting. (Blue shadows on snow inspired the technique.)

New technology played a role in the development of the style. Impressionists took advantage of the mid-century introduction of premixed paints in tin tubes (resembling modern toothpaste tubes), which allowed artists to work more spontaneously, both outdoors and indoors. Previously, painters made their own paints individually, by grinding and mixing dry pigment powders with linseed oil, which were then stored in animal bladders.

Many vivid synthetic pigments became commercially available to artists for the first time during the 19th century. These included cobalt blue, viridian, cadmium yellow, and synthetic ultramarine blue, all of which were in use by the 1840s, before Impressionism. The Impressionists' manner of painting made bold use of these pigments, and of even newer colours such as cerulean blue, which became commercially available to artists in the 1860s.

The Impressionists' progress toward a brighter style of painting was gradual. During the 1860s, Monet and Renoir sometimes painted on canvases prepared with the traditional red-brown or grey ground. By the 1870s, Monet, Renoir, and Pissarro usually chose to paint on grounds of a lighter grey or beige colour, which functioned as a middle tone in the finished painting. By the 1880s, some of the Impressionists had come to prefer white or slightly off-white grounds, and no longer allowed the ground colour a significant role in the finished painting.

Content and composition 

Prior to the Impressionists, other painters, notably such 17th-century Dutch painters as Jan Steen, had emphasized common subjects, but their methods of composition were traditional. They arranged their compositions so that the main subject commanded the viewer's attention. J. M. W. Turner, while an artist of the Romantic era, anticipated the style of impressionism with his artwork. The Impressionists relaxed the boundary between subject and background so that the effect of an Impressionist painting often resembles a snapshot, a part of a larger reality captured as if by chance. Photography was gaining popularity, and as cameras became more portable, photographs became more candid. Photography inspired Impressionists to represent momentary action, not only in the fleeting lights of a landscape, but in the day-to-day lives of people.

The development of Impressionism can be considered partly as a reaction by artists to the challenge presented by photography, which seemed to devalue the artist's skill in reproducing reality. Both portrait and landscape paintings were deemed somewhat deficient and lacking in truth as photography "produced lifelike images much more efficiently and reliably".

In spite of this, photography actually inspired artists to pursue other means of creative expression, and rather than compete with photography to emulate reality, artists focused "on the one thing they could inevitably do better than the photograph—by further developing into an art form its very subjectivity in the conception of the image, the very subjectivity that photography eliminated". The Impressionists sought to express their perceptions of nature, rather than create exact representations. This allowed artists to depict subjectively what they saw with their "tacit imperatives of taste and conscience". Photography encouraged painters to exploit aspects of the painting medium, like colour, which photography then lacked: "The Impressionists were the first to consciously offer a subjective alternative to the photograph".

Another major influence was Japanese ukiyo-e art prints (Japonism). The art of these prints contributed significantly to the "snapshot" angles and unconventional compositions that became characteristic of Impressionism. An example is Monet's Jardin à Sainte-Adresse, 1867, with its bold blocks of colour and composition on a strong diagonal slant showing the influence of Japanese prints.

Edgar Degas was both an avid photographer and a collector of Japanese prints. His The Dance Class (La classe de danse) of 1874 shows both influences in its asymmetrical composition. The dancers are seemingly caught off guard in various awkward poses, leaving an expanse of empty floor space in the lower right quadrant. He also captured his dancers in sculpture, such as the Little Dancer of Fourteen Years.

Female Impressionists 

Impressionists, in varying degrees, were looking for ways to depict visual experience and contemporary subjects. Female Impressionists were interested in these same ideals but had many social and career limitations compared to male Impressionists. They were particularly excluded from the imagery of the bourgeois social sphere of the boulevard, cafe, and dance hall. As well as imagery, women were excluded from the formative discussions that resulted in meetings in those places; that was where male Impressionists were able to form and share ideas about Impressionism. In the academic realm, women were believed to be incapable of handling complex subjects which led teachers to restrict what they taught female students. It was also considered unladylike to excel in art since women's true talents were then believed to center on homemaking and mothering.

Yet several women were able to find success during their lifetime, even though their careers were affected by personal circumstances – Bracquemond, for example, had a husband who was resentful of her work which caused her to give up painting. The four most well known, namely, Mary Cassatt, Eva Gonzalès, Marie Bracquemond, and Berthe Morisot, are, and were, often referred to as the 'Women Impressionists'. Their participation in the series of eight Impressionist exhibitions that took place in Paris from 1874 to 1886 varied: Morisot participated in seven, Cassatt in four, Bracquemond in three, and Gonzalès did not participate.

The critics of the time lumped these four together without regard to their personal styles, techniques, or subject matter. Critics viewing their works at the exhibitions often attempted to acknowledge the women artists' talents but circumscribed them within a limited notion of femininity. Arguing for the suitability of Impressionist technique to women's manner of perception, Parisian critic S.C. de Soissons wrote:One can understand that women have no originality of thought, and that literature and music have no feminine character; but surely women know how to observe, and what they see is quite different from that which men see, and the art which they put in their gestures, in their toilet, in the decoration of their environment is sufficient to give is the idea of an instinctive, of a peculiar genius which resides in each one of them.While Impressionism legitimized the domestic social life as subject matter, of which women had intimate knowledge, it also tended to limit them to that subject matter. Portrayals of often-identifiable sitters in domestic settings (which could offer commissions) were dominant in the exhibitions. The subjects of the paintings were often women interacting with their environment by either their gaze or movement. Cassatt, in particular, was aware of her placement of subjects: she kept her predominantly female figures from objectification and cliche; when they are not reading, they converse, sew, drink tea, and when they are inactive, they seem lost in thought.

The women Impressionists, like their male counterparts, were striving for "truth," for new ways of seeing and new painting techniques; each artist had an individual painting style. Women Impressionists (particularly Morisot and Cassatt) were conscious of the balance of power between women and objects in their paintings – the bourgeois women depicted are not defined by decorative objects, but instead, interact with and dominate the things with which they live. There are many similarities in their depictions of women who seem both at ease and subtly confined. Gonzalès' Box at the Italian Opera depicts a woman staring into the distance, at ease in a social sphere but confined by the box and the man standing next to her. Cassatt's painting Young Girl at a Window is brighter in color but remains constrained by the canvas edge as she looks out the window.

Despite their success in their ability to have a career and Impressionism's demise attributed to its allegedly feminine characteristics (its sensuality, dependence on sensation, physicality, and fluidity) the four women artists (and other, lesser-known women Impressionists) were largely omitted from art historical textbooks covering Impressionist artists until Tamar Garb's Women Impressionists published in 1986. For example, Impressionism by Jean Leymarie, published in 1955 included no information on any women Impressionists.

Painter Androniqi Zengo Antoniu is co-credited with the introduction of impressionism to Albania.

Prominent Impressionists 
The central figures in the development of Impressionism in France, listed alphabetically, were:
 Frédéric Bazille (1841–1870), who only posthumously participated in the Impressionist exhibitions
 Gustave Caillebotte (1848–1894), who, younger than the others, joined forces with them in the mid-1870s
 Mary Cassatt (1844–1926), American-born, she lived in Paris and participated in four Impressionist exhibitions
 Paul Cézanne (1839–1906), although he later broke away from the Impressionists
 Edgar Degas (1834–1917), who despised the term Impressionist
 Armand Guillaumin (1841–1927)
 Édouard Manet (1832–1883), who did not participate in any of the Impressionist exhibitions
 Claude Monet (1840–1926), the most prolific of the Impressionists and the one who embodies their aesthetic most obviously
 Berthe Morisot (1841–1895) who participated in all Impressionist exhibitions except in 1879
 Camille Pissarro (1830–1903)
 Pierre-Auguste Renoir (1841–1919), who participated in Impressionist exhibitions in 1874, 1876, 1877 and 1882
 Alfred Sisley (1839–1899)

Gallery

Timeline: lives of the Impressionists

Associates and influenced artists 

Among the close associates of the Impressionists, Victor Vignon is the only artist outside the group of prominent names who participated to the most exclusive Seventh Paris Impressionist Exhibition in 1882, which was indeed a rejection to the previous less restricted exhibitions chiefly organized by Degas. Originally from the school of Corot, Vignon was a friend of Camille Pissarro, whose influence is evident in his impressionist style after the late 1870s, and a friend of post-impressionist Vincent van Gogh.

There were several other close associates of the Impressionists who adopted their methods to some degree. These include Jean-Louis Forain (who participated in Impressionist exhibitions in 1879, 1880, 1881 and 1886) and Giuseppe De Nittis, an Italian artist living in Paris who participated in the first Impressionist exhibit at the invitation of Degas, although the other Impressionists disparaged his work. Federico Zandomeneghi was another Italian friend of Degas who showed with the Impressionists. Eva Gonzalès was a follower of Manet who did not exhibit with the group. James Abbott McNeill Whistler was an American-born painter who played a part in Impressionism although he did not join the group and preferred grayed colours. Walter Sickert, an English artist, was initially a follower of Whistler, and later an important disciple of Degas; he did not exhibit with the Impressionists. In 1904 the artist and writer Wynford Dewhurst wrote the first important study of the French painters published in English, Impressionist Painting: its genesis and development, which did much to popularize Impressionism in Great Britain.

By the early 1880s, Impressionist methods were affecting, at least superficially, the art of the Salon. Fashionable painters such as Jean Béraud and Henri Gervex found critical and financial success by brightening their palettes while retaining the smooth finish expected of Salon art. Works by these artists are sometimes casually referred to as Impressionism, despite their remoteness from Impressionist practice.

The influence of the French Impressionists lasted long after most of them had died. Artists like J.D. Kirszenbaum were borrowing Impressionist techniques throughout the twentieth century.

Beyond France 

As the influence of Impressionism spread beyond France, artists, too numerous to list, became identified as practitioners of the new style. Some of the more important examples are:
 The American Impressionists, including Mary Cassatt, William Merritt Chase, Frederick Carl Frieseke, Childe Hassam, Willard Metcalf, Lilla Cabot Perry, Theodore Robinson, Edmund Charles Tarbell, John Henry Twachtman, Catherine Wiley and J. Alden Weir.
 The Australian Impressionists, including Tom Roberts, Arthur Streeton, Walter Withers, Charles Conder and Frederick McCubbin (who were prominent members of the Heidelberg School), and John Russell, a friend of Van Gogh, Rodin, Monet and Matisse.
 The Amsterdam Impressionists in the Netherlands, including George Hendrik Breitner, Isaac Israëls, Willem Bastiaan Tholen, Willem de Zwart, Willem Witsen and Jan Toorop.
 The California Impressionists, including William Wendt, Guy Rose, Alson Clark, Donna N. Schuster, and Sam Hyde Harris.
 Anna Boch, Vincent van Gogh's friend Eugène Boch, Georges Lemmen and Théo van Rysselberghe, Impressionist painters from Belgium.
 Ivan Grohar, Rihard Jakopič, Matija Jama, and Matej Sternen, Impressionists from Slovenia. Their beginning was in the school of Anton Ažbe in Munich and they were influenced by Jurij Šubic and Ivana Kobilca, Slovenian painters working in Paris.
 Wynford Dewhurst, Walter Richard Sickert, and Philip Wilson Steer were well known Impressionist painters from the United Kingdom. Pierre Adolphe Valette, who was born in France but who worked in Manchester, was the tutor of L. S. Lowry.
 The German Impressionists, including Max Liebermann, Lovis Corinth, Ernst Oppler, Max Slevogt and August von Brandis.
 László Mednyánszky and Pál Szinyei-Merse in Hungary
 Theodor von Ehrmanns and Hugo Charlemont who were rare Impressionists among the more dominant Vienna Secessionist painters in Austria.
 William John Leech, Roderic O'Conor, and Walter Osborne in Ireland
 Konstantin Korovin and Valentin Serov in Russia
 Francisco Oller y Cestero, a native of Puerto Rico and a friend of Pissarro and Cézanne
 James Nairn in New Zealand
 William McTaggart in Scotland
 Laura Muntz Lyall, a Canadian artist
 Władysław Podkowiński, a Polish Impressionist and symbolist
 Nicolae Grigorescu in Romania
 Nazmi Ziya Güran, who brought Impressionism to Turkey
 Chafik Charobim in Egypt
 Eliseu Visconti in Brazil
 Joaquín Sorolla in Spain
 Faustino Brughetti, Fernando Fader, Candido Lopez, Martín Malharro, Walter de Navazio, Ramón Silva in Argentina
 Skagen Painters a group of Scandinavian artists who painted in a small Danish fishing village
 Nadežda Petrović, Milo Milunović, Kosta Miličević, Milan Milovanovi and Mališa Glišić in Serbia
 Ásgrímur Jónsson in Iceland
 Fujishima Takeji in Japan
 Frits Thaulow in Norway and later France

Sculpture, photography and film 
The sculptor Auguste Rodin is sometimes called an Impressionist for the way he used roughly modeled surfaces to suggest transient light effects.

Pictorialist photographers whose work is characterized by soft focus and atmospheric effects have also been called Impressionists.

French Impressionist Cinema is a term applied to a loosely defined group of films and filmmakers in France from 1919 to 1929, although these years are debatable. French Impressionist filmmakers include Abel Gance, Jean Epstein, Germaine Dulac, Marcel L’Herbier, Louis Delluc, and Dmitry Kirsanoff.

Music and literature 

Musical Impressionism is the name given to a movement in European classical music that arose in the late 19th century and continued into the middle of the 20th century. Originating in France, musical Impressionism is characterized by suggestion and atmosphere, and eschews the emotional excesses of the Romantic era. Impressionist composers favoured short forms such as the nocturne, arabesque, and prelude, and often explored uncommon scales such as the whole tone scale. Perhaps the most notable innovations of Impressionist composers were the introduction of major 7th chords and the extension of chord structures in 3rds to five- and six-part harmonies.

The influence of visual Impressionism on its musical counterpart is debatable. Claude Debussy and Maurice Ravel are generally considered the greatest Impressionist composers, but Debussy disavowed the term, calling it the invention of critics. Erik Satie was also considered in this category, though his approach was regarded as less serious, more musical novelty in nature. Paul Dukas is another French composer sometimes considered an Impressionist, but his style is perhaps more closely aligned to the late Romanticists. Musical Impressionism beyond France includes the work of such composers as Ottorino Respighi (Italy), Ralph Vaughan Williams, Cyril Scott, and John Ireland (England), Manuel De Falla and Isaac Albeniz (Spain), and Charles Griffes (America).

The term Impressionism has also been used to describe works of literature in which a few select details suffice to convey the sensory impressions of an incident or scene. Impressionist literature is closely related to Symbolism, with its major exemplars being Baudelaire, Mallarmé, Rimbaud, and Verlaine. Authors such as Virginia Woolf, D.H. Lawrence, Henry James, and Joseph Conrad have written works that are Impressionistic in the way that they describe, rather than interpret, the impressions, sensations and emotions that constitute a character's mental life.

Post-Impressionism 

During the 1880s several artists began to develop different precepts for the use of colour, pattern, form, and line, derived from the Impressionist example: Vincent van Gogh, Paul Gauguin, Georges Seurat, and Henri de Toulouse-Lautrec. These artists were slightly younger than the Impressionists, and their work is known as post-Impressionism. Some of the original Impressionist artists also ventured into this new territory; Camille Pissarro briefly painted in a pointillist manner, and even Monet abandoned strict plein air painting. Paul Cézanne, who participated in the first and third Impressionist exhibitions, developed a highly individual vision emphasising pictorial structure, and he is more often called a post-Impressionist. Although these cases illustrate the difficulty of assigning labels, the work of the original Impressionist painters may, by definition, be categorised as Impressionism.

See also 
 Art periods
 Cantonese school of painting
 Expressionism (as a reaction to Impressionism)
 Les XX
 Luminism (Impressionism)
 History of Painting
 Western Painting

Notes

References 

 Baumann, Felix Andreas, Marianne Karabelnik-Matta, Jean Sutherland Boggs, and Tobia Bezzola (1994). Degas Portraits. London: Merrell Holberton. 
 Bomford, David, Jo Kirby, John Leighton, Ashok Roy, and Raymond White (1990). Impressionism. London: National Gallery. 
 Denvir, Bernard (1990). The Thames and Hudson Encyclopaedia of Impressionism. London: Thames and Hudson. 
 Distel, Anne, Michel Hoog, and Charles S. Moffett (1974). Impressionism; a centenary exhibition, the Metropolitan Museum of Art, December 12, 1974 – February 10, 1975 . New York: Metropolitan Museum of Art. 
 Eisenman, Stephen F (2011). "From Corot to Monet: The Ecology of Impressionism". Milan: Skira. .
 Gordon, Robert; Forge, Andrew (1988). Degas. New York: Harry N. Abrams. 
 Gowing, Lawrence, with Adriani, Götz; Krumrine, Mary Louise; Lewis, Mary Tompkins; Patin, Sylvie; Rewald, John (1988). Cézanne: The Early Years 1859–1872. New York: Harry N. Abrams.
 Jensen, Robert (1994). Marketing modernism in fin-de-siècle Europe. Princeton, N.J.: Princeton University Press. .
 Moskowitz, Ira; Sérullaz, Maurice (1962). French Impressionists: A Selection of Drawings of the French 19th Century. Boston and Toronto: Little, Brown and Company. 
 Rewald, John (1973). The History of Impressionism (4th, Revised Ed.). New York: The Museum of Modern Art. 
 Richardson, John (1976). Manet (3rd Ed.). Oxford: Phaidon Press Ltd. 
 Rosenblum, Robert (1989). Paintings in the Musée d'Orsay. New York: Stewart, Tabori & Chang. 
 Moffett, Charles S. (1986). "The New Painting, Impressionism 1874–1886". Geneva: Richard Burton SA.

External links 

 Hecht Museum
 
 Museumsportal Schleswig-Holstein
 Impressionism : A Centenary Exhibition, the Metropolitan Museum of Art, December 12, 1974 – February 10, 1975, fully digitized text from The Metropolitan Museum of Art libraries
 Suburban Pastoral The Guardian, 24 February 2007
 Impressionism: Paintings collected by European Museums (1999) was an art exhibition co-organized by the High Museum of Art, Atlanta, the Seattle Art Museum, and the Denver Art Museum, touring from May through December 1999. Online guided tour
 Monet's Years at Giverny: Beyond Impressionism, 1978 exhibition catalogue fully online as PDF from The Metropolitan Museum of Art, which discusses Monet's role in this movement
 Degas: The Artist's Mind, 1976 exhibition catalogue fully online as PDF from The Metropolitan Museum of Art, which discusses Degas's role in this movement
 Definition of impressionism on the Tate Art Glossary

 
Art movements
French art
Articles which contain graphical timelines